John Tresize (born 26 February 1954) is a former Australian rules footballer who played with Carlton in the Victorian Football League (VFL).

Notes

External links 

John Tresize's profile at Blueseum

1954 births
Carlton Football Club players
Living people
Australian rules footballers from Bendigo